Kosmos 319 ( meaning Cosmos 319), known before launch as DS-P1-Yu No.25, was a Soviet satellite which was launched in 1970 as part of the Dnepropetrovsk Sputnik programme. It was a  spacecraft, which was built by the Yuzhnoye Design Bureau, and was used as a radar calibration target for anti-ballistic missile tests.

Launch 
Kosmos 319 was launched from Site 133/1 at the Plesetsk Cosmodrome, atop a Kosmos-2I 63SM carrier rocket. The launch occurred on 15 January 1970 at 13:39:59 UTC, and resulted in the successful deployment of Kosmos 319 into low Earth orbit. Upon reaching orbit, it was assigned its Kosmos designation, and received the International Designator 1970-004A.

Orbit 
It remained in orbit until it decayed and reentered the atmosphere on 1 July 1970. It was the twenty-ninth of seventy nine DS-P1-Yu satellites to be launched, and the twenty-seventh of seventy two to successfully reach orbit.

References

Kosmos satellites
Spacecraft launched in 1970
1970 in the Soviet Union
Dnepropetrovsk Sputnik program